Rolla Milton Tryon Jr. (August 26, 1916 – August 20, 2001) was an American botanist who specialized in the systematics and evolution of ferns and other spore-dispersed plants (pteridology).  His particular focus and interest lay in two areas, historical biogeography of ferns and the taxonomy of tropical American ferns.

Biography

Rolla Milton Tryon Jr. was born August 26, 1916 in Chicago. His father was an American history and education professor at the University of Chicago.

Tryon's first scientific paper was published in 1934 (at the age of 18) on the ferns in Chesterton, Indiana where his family’s summer cottage was located. In 1935, he received his A.A. degree and in 1937 his B.S., both from the University of Chicago. He enrolled in the University of Wisconsin for a Ph.M., graduating in 1938. Then, at Harvard, earning he earned both his M.S. in 1940 and  Ph.D. in 1941 working with Merritt Lyndon Fernald and Charles Alfred Weatherby on ferns in the genera Pteridium and Doryopteris.

During World War II, he worked as a lab technician in the U.S. Chemical Warfare Service at the Massachusetts Institute of Technology. After the war, he returned to teach at Dartmouth College. then at the University of Wisconsin, where he met his future wife and lifelong collaborator, Alice Faber, a student at the time. In 1947, Tryon joined the faculty at Washington University in St. Louis as an Associate Professor of Botany and became assistant curator in the herbarium of the Missouri Botanical Garden.

Tryon left Missouri in 1957 to travel with Alice to Peru to study the fern flora of the American tropics. When they returned, Tryon served as a research associate at the University of California  Herbarium at Berkeley. In 1958, Tryon returned to Harvard as Curator of Ferns at the Gray Herbarium where he remained with his wife until 1987. In 1972, he became a professor of biology at Harvard.

The two Tryons wrote a complete survey of ferns, Ferns and Allied Plants: with Special Reference to Tropical America, with emphasis on tropical America, which was published in 1982.

Tryon was a member of the American Fern Society for 69 years, starting in 1932, and held various roles in the society including curator and librarian of the library and herbarium from 1946 to 1957; president from 1974-1975; he was made an honorary member in 1978. At the New England Botanical Club, he was recording secretary from 1964-1968, associate editor of the Society’s Journal Rhodora from 1961-1977, editor-in-chief from 1977-1981, vice-president from 1984-1986 and president from 1986-1988. In 1984, he received a Merit Award from the Botanical Society of America.

Following his Harvard retirement, he became an adjunct professor at the University of South Florida in Tampa. He died August 20, 2001.

Footnotes 

American botanists
Missouri Botanical Garden people
1916 births
2001 deaths
Harvard University alumni
Pteridologists
University of Chicago alumni
University of Wisconsin–Madison alumni
Harvard University faculty
Washington University in St. Louis faculty
20th-century American botanists
American botanical writers
University of California, Berkeley staff